The Centenary Prize is an award granted annually by the United Kingdom-based Royal Society of Chemistry (RSC) to up to three "outstanding chemists, who are also exceptional communicators, from overseas".

The prize, established in 1947, and first awarded in 1949, by the RSC's forerunner, the Chemical Society, is named after the centenary of that organisation's founding, in 1841. Winners are given a £5000 cash prize, a medal and a certificate, and undertake a lecture tour of the UK.

Winners 

 2021 Bin Liu, Jean-Luc Brédas, Douglas Stephan
 2020 Eric Anslyn, Teri W. Odom, James Tour
 2019 Laura Kiessling, David MacMillan, Roberta Sessoli
 2018 Jacqueline Barton, John Hartwig, Richard Kaner
 2017 Odile Eisenstein, William J. Evans, Ben Feringa
 2016 Kenneth Suslick, R. J. Dwayne Miller, Michael Grätzel
 2015 Chad Mirkin, Geoffrey Ozin, Jean-Marie Tarascon,
 2014 Eiichi Nakamura, Fraser Stoddart, Karen L. Wooley
 2013 Robert H. Crabtree, Richard Silverman, Chi-Ming Che
 2012 Craig Hawker, Timothy M. Swager, 
 2011 G. Marius Clore, Jonathan Sessler, R. Graham Cooks
 2010 Avelino Corma Canos, Stephen Lippard, Omar Yaghi
the 2009/2010 lectures were delivered by: Michel Che, John Katzenellenbogen, Leonard Francis Lindoy
 2009 Aaron Ciechanover, 
 2008 , Masakatsu Shibasaki, Achim Müller
 2007 Trygve Helgaker, Don Tilley, 
 2006 Stephen J. Benkovic, Ilya I. Moiseev
 2005 Goverdhan Mehta, Vivian Wing-Wah Yam, Royce W. Murray
 2004 Robert Grubbs, 
 2003 Akkihebbal Ravishankara, Edward I. Solomon, Alois Fürstner
 2002 Manfred T. Reetz, Amos B. Smith
 2001 Kyriacos Costa Nicolaou, Richard J. Saykally, Karl Weighardt
 2000 Maurice Brookhart, C. N. R. Rao
 1999 Jean-Pierre Sauvage, Henri Kagan, Robin Hochstrasser
 1998 Robert F. Curl, Marion Frederick Hawthorne, 
 1997 Richard Zare, Larry E. Overman, Arndt Simon
 1996 , Helmut Ringsdorf, Tobin J. Marks
 1995 Clayton H. Heathcock, Vincenzo Balzani, Graham R. Fleming
 1994 Malcolm H. Chisholm, A. Ian Scott, 
 1993 Alexander Pines, Barry Sharpless, 
 1992 Leo A. Paquette, Alan Sargeson, Henry F. Schaefer
 1991 , Athelstan Beckwith, 
 1990 Richard R. Schrock, Dieter Seebach, Noel S. Hush
 1989 , Marc Julia, Endel Lippmaa
 1988 Rudolph A. Marcus, Ryōji Noyori, Warren R. Roper
 1987 Allen J. Bard, Christopher T. Walsh
 1986 Robert Bruce Merrifield, Stuart A. Rice, Alan H. Cowley
 1985 Gerhard Ertl, Herbert W. Roesky
 1984 Harry B. Gray, Meir Lahav, Benjamin Widom
 1983 Gábor A. Somorjai, Virgil Boekelheide, 
 1982 Alan MacDiarmid, Albert I. Meyers
 1981 Barry Trost, Earl Muetterties, Takeshi Oka
 1980 James Ibers, Jean-Marie Lehn, Jürgen Troe
 1979 Richard H. Holm, Henry Taube
 1978 Heinz Gerischer, Koji Nakanishi, 
 1977 Jack D. Dunitz, George A. Olah, Kenneth Sanborn Pitzer
 1976 Dudley R. Herschbach, Alfred Edward Ringwood, Karel Wiesner
 1975 Donald J. Cram, John B. Goodenough, Willis H. Flygare
 1974 Gilbert Stork, Ernst Otto Fischer, Roald Hoffmann
 1973 Duilio Arigoni, Frank Albert Cotton, 
 1972 John Anthony Pople, Jan Peter Toennies, William Summer Johnson
 1971 Ronald Breslow, William Lipscomb
 1970 Elias J. Corey, Edgar Bright Wilson
 1969 Albert Eschenmoser
 1968 Erwin Wilhelm Müller, Paul Doughty Bartlett
 1967 Saul Winstein
 1966 , 
 1965 , Wiktor Kemula, John D. Roberts
 1964 John C. Polanyi, Feodor Lynen
 1963 Carl Djerassi
 1962 Frank Westheimer, Richard Kuhn
 1961 George B. Kistiakowsky, 
 1960 Rolf Huisgen, 
 1959 , Nils Andreas Sørensen, Michael Heidelberger
 1958 Gerhard Herzberg, Klaus Clusius, Wilhelm Klemm
 1957 , Odd Hassel
 1956 Glenn T. Seaborg
 1955 Melvin Calvin, Herbert C. Brown
 1954 
 1953 Arne Tiselius
 1952 Tadeusz Reichstein
 1951 Robert B. Woodward, Kaj Ulrik Linderstrøm-Lang
 1950 
 1949 Vladimir Prelog,

See also

 List of chemistry awards

References 

Awards of the Royal Society of Chemistry
1947 establishments in England